Malika Tahir (1 April 1976) is a French figure skating coach and former competitor. She is the 1996 French national bronze medalist and competed in the final segment at two ISU Championships — the 1994 World Junior Championships, where she finished 12th, and the 1995 European Championships, where she placed 23rd. She finished ninth at the 1997 Winter Universiade.

Tahir retired from competition around 1998 and began her coaching career. She is based in Reims, France. Her students include Lorine Schild and Lola Ghozali.

Results

References

1976 births
French female single skaters
French figure skating coaches
Living people
Competitors at the 1997 Winter Universiade